2NB is a South Korean R&B duo formed by Friday Entertainment in 2006. The duo consisted of Heo Sol-ji and Kim Song-yi. They released their debut single "The First Fragrance" on March 31, 2006. The group disbanded in 2012. Shortly afterwards, the former became the main singer of the girl group EXID, which debuted that same year. Also, Kim Song-yi became the lead singer of the girl group Blady, which was in 2015. In 2016, 2NB came back with two new members Son Yoo-na and Kim Hyo-jin.

Members

Current
Kim Hyo-jin (2016–present)

Former
Heo Sol-ji (2006 - 2012)
Kim Song-yi (Gabin) (2008 - 2012)
Kim Ga-hee (2006 - 2007)
Son Yoo-na (2016–2018)

Member timeline

Discography

EPs

Studio albums

Best albums

Singles

Original Soundtracks

Collaborations

References

External links
 
 Official blog

2006 establishments in South Korea
2012 disestablishments in South Korea
Musical groups established in 2008
Musical groups disestablished in 2012
Musical groups reestablished in 2016
South Korean musical duos
South Korean contemporary R&B musical groups
South Korean girl groups
K-pop music groups